Bogdan Bortnik (born January 24, 1992) is a Ukrainian footballer who plays as a forward.

Career 
Bortnik began his career in the Ukrainian Second League in 2009 with FC Dynamo Khmelnytskyi. After four seasons with Dynamo he signed with FC Vorkuta in the Canadian Soccer League. In his debut season he assisted in securing the regular season title. Throughout the season he featured primarily in the Second Division, where he appeared in seven matches and recorded one goal. For the 2019 season he was transferred to expansion franchise Kingsman SC.

References 

1992 births
Living people
Ukrainian footballers
FC Dynamo Khmelnytskyi players
FC Continentals players
Canadian Soccer League (1998–present) players
Association football forwards
Ukrainian Second League players